Hyalopeziza is a genus of fungi within the Hyaloscyphaceae family. The genus contains 20 species.

References

External links
Hyalopeziza at Index Fungorum

Hyaloscyphaceae
Taxa named by Karl Wilhelm Gottlieb Leopold Fuckel